The Beast is a 1996 television movie starring William Petersen, Karen Sillas and Charles Martin Smith. Aired in two parts as a miniseries, the movie is based on the 1991 novel Beast by Jaws author Peter Benchley.  The film is about a giant squid that attacks and kills several people when its food supply becomes scarce and its offspring is killed.

It was filmed primarily in Sydney, New South Wales, Australia.

Plot
The film begins with Howard Griffin and Elizabeth Griffin having a romantic night out on a yacht near the Pacific Northwest resort community, Graves' Point. After a freak occurrence causes the yacht to sink, the two are forced to head for shore in a lifeboat, only to be attacked and eaten by an unseen creature hours later. The next day, local fisherman Whip Dalton (William Petersen) finds the empty lifeboat and discovers a large claw stuck into the boat. Whip sends the claw to a university to be analyzed and it ends up in the hands of marine biologist Dr. Herbert Talley (Ronald Guttman), who comes to Grave's Point claiming it is from the tentacle of a giant squid. The island harbor master Schuyler Graves (Charles Martin Smith) hires Lucas Coven (Larry Drake) to kill the squid after both Whip's initial advice to leave it alone and several more deaths caused by the squid. Coven succeeds in slaying a squid and the carcass is promptly sold by Graves to Sea Land Texas owner Osborne Manning (Denis Arndt). The unmanned sonar detects another, much larger squid which remains unnoticed by the islanders.

When Whip and Talley are not allowed to see the squid to examine it, Dr. Talley organizes a submersible expedition to explore the squid's habitat. After analyzing the carcass of the dead squid, the scientists determine it is just a baby. The information comes too late, however, and the adult squid, the baby's mother, attacks the submersible, killing everyone on board. Whip angrily blames Graves for the incident, which also resulted in the death of Christopher, Talley's assistant and boyfriend of Dana (Missy Crider), Whip's daughter. Graves then blackmails Lucas, threatening to shut Lucas down for illegal trap fishing unless he resumes the hunt for the adult squid. Dr. Talley explains to Whip that the giant squid is killing out of vengeance for the death of her offspring rather than hunger, and is now even more dangerous as a result.

Lucas resumes the hunt along with Whip's friend, Mike, and another crew member named Scranton (David Field). After enduring stormy weather they decide to head back to shore and continue the hunt the next day. The Squid attacks the boat before they make it to shore, devouring Scranton and knocking a cargo net on Mike, injuring him. It then attacks Lucas in the helm who fires a couple of shots with his gun at its tentacles. The squid then bites a hole in the hull. With water pouring in, it pulls the entire boat underwater, drowning Lucas. Whip, after learning that Mike went out to help Lucas comes to the rescue and, finding Mike holding onto a buoy, pulls him out of the water and takes him to the hospital. Whip then agrees to go out and hunt the giant squid but only if he can use his boat and Graves goes with him. He is also accompanied by coast guard officer, Lt. Kathryn Marcus (Karen Sillas), Dr. Talley, and Manning.

They plan to snare the squid, reel it in and shoot it multiple times with darts full of cyanide. The plan succeeds and the squid appears dead. But when the ship's engine breaks down, Manning reveals that he filled the darts with tranquilizer instead of cyanide so he could take the squid alive back to Sea Land. Graves tried to escape on a lifeboat as Whip cuts the squid loose just as it awakes. The squid soon chases down and kills Graves. Afterword's, it resumes the attack on Whip's boat, killing Manning and then jumping on the boat. It then grabs Talley and eats him. A coast guard  helicopter arrives in time to pick up Kathryn and Whip. As he boards the helicopter, Whip fends the squid off with an axe, chopping open several extra fuel drums and has Kathryn use a flare gun to set his boat on fire. The squid is unable to escape as an explosion blows up the squid's beak and lower body, killing it. The helicopter flies them back to the shore where they reunite with Dana.

Cast
 William Petersen as Whip Dalton
 Karen Sillas as Lt. Kathryn Marcus
 Charles Martin Smith as Schuyler Graves
 Ronald Guttman as Dr. Herbert Talley
 Missy Crider as Dana Dalton
 Sterling Macer Jr. as Mike Newcombe
 Denis Arndt as Osborne Manning
 Adrienne-Joi Johnson as Nell Newcombe
 Larry Drake as Lucas Coven
 Murray Bartlett as Christopher Lane
 Laura Vazquez as Hadley
 Blake Kearney as The Sax Player

Differences from novel
This TV adaption based on Peter Benchley's novel of the same name is mostly faithful to the source material; but some changes were made for the sake of film locations and pacing. In the novel, the squid has much younger offspring which do not make an appearance until the end of the novel, and the titular squid is killed by a sperm whale, not by an explosion as in the movie. Many storylines and characters are added or changed in the TV adaptation. For one thing, the book took place in Bermuda while the movie took place in a Pacific North West community resort called Grave's Point.

References

External links
 
 

1996 films
1996 horror films
1996 television films
1990s American television miniseries
American natural horror films
American television films
Films scored by Don Davis (composer)
Films about cephalopods
Films about the United States Coast Guard
Films based on American novels
Films based on horror novels
Films set in North America
Films shot in Australia
Films directed by Jeff Bleckner
Films based on works by Peter Benchley
Giant squid
Australian action adventure films
1990s English-language films
1990s American films